Luiz de Aguiar Costa Pinto (February 6, 1920 – November 1, 2002) was a Brazilian sociologist. In his work, Costa Pinto specialized in race relations in Brazil. He was one of the authors of the landmark UNESCO statement The Race Question, in 1950. In the latter part of his career, in Canada, Costa Pinto taught first at Queen's University, and then at the University of Waterloo.

He was a member of the first generation of major contemporary Brazilian sociologists, working with Florestan Fernandes, Roger Bastide, Oracy Nogueira and Thales de Azevedo. Costa Pinto was born in Salvador, and died in Waterloo, Canada.

References

Brazilian sociologists
Academic staff of the University of Waterloo
2002 deaths
1920 births
Brazilian expatriates in Canada